There have been eight baronetcies created for persons with the surname Graham, two in the Baronetage of Nova Scotia, two in the Baronetage of England, one in the Baronetage of Great Britain and three in the Baronetage of the United Kingdom.

The title became dormant on the death of the fourth Baronet in c. 1700 but has since been assumed by the Duke of Montrose.

He represented Carlisle in Parliament, was a Gentleman of the Horse to King Charles I and fought at the Battle of Edgehill in 1642. The third Baronet served as Ambassador to France and as Secretary of State to King James II. In 1681 he was created Lord Graham of Esk and Viscount Preston in the Peerage of Scotland. After the Glorious Revolution he was created Baron of Esk in the peerage of England by the exiled King James II and was condemned for high treason but was later pardoned. The peerages became extinct on the death of the third Viscount in 1739. The late Viscount was succeeded in the baronetcy by his kinsman William Graham, the sixth Baronet. The thirteenth Baronet never successfully proved his succession and was never on the Official Roll of the Baronetage. As of 31 December 2013 the present Baronet also has not successfully proven his succession and is therefore not on the Official Roll of the Baronetage, with the baronetcy considered dormant since .

This was in honour of his services to The Restoration of the monarchy. Graham was the second son of the first Graham Baronet of the 1629 creation.

He later represented Ripon in the House of Commons. This branch of the Graham family was descended from the Very Reverend William Graham, fourth son of the second Baronet of the 1629 creation. The second Baronet was a prominent statesman and notably served under Lord John Russell as Home Secretary from 1841 to 1846. In 1885, Lady Hermione Graham, the mother of the fourth Baronet and a daughter of the twelfth Duke of Somerset, inherited Somerset House in Park Lane, but it was soon sold. The sixth Baronet held the honorary post of Lord-Lieutenant of Cumberland from 1958 to 1968 and was President of the Country Landowners Association from 1971 to 1973.

He sat as Member of Parliament for Carlisle between 1812 and 1825. The fifth Baronet was Lieutenant-Governor of Grenada from 1875 to 1877. On his death in  the title became extinct.

He was a member of the firm of William Graham and Co, merchants, of Glasgow, and of Grahams Co, of London, East India merchants. This branch of the Graham family is descended from John, third son of Sir David Graham of Dundaff, ancestor of the Dukes of Montrose. The third Baronet was Lieutenant-Colonel Sir Reginald Graham, 3rd Baronet VC OBE, brother of Glenda Spooner founder, chairman and organising secretary of the Ponies of Britain Club. Sir John Graham, 4th Baronet was Ambassador to Iraq from 1974 to 1977 and Iran from 1979 to 1980. His son Sir Andrew Graham, 5th Baronet is a lieutenant general who was Director General of the Defence Academy of the United Kingdom.

He was a director of John Graham, Ltd, engineering contractors, and Chairman of the Standing Committee of the Ulster Unionist Council from 1947 to 1963.

Graham baronets, of Braco (1625)
Sir William Graham, 1st Baronet (died )
Sir John Graham, 2nd Baronet (died c. 1646)
Sir William Graham, 3rd Baronet (died c. 1684)
Sir James Graham, 4th Baronet (c. 1661–c. 1700) (dormant)
now assumed by the Duke of Montrose

Graham baronets, of Esk (1629)
Sir Richard Graham, 1st Baronet (died 1654)
Sir George Graham, 2nd Baronet (c. 1624–1658)
Sir Richard Graham, 3rd Baronet (1648–1695) (created Viscount Preston in 1681)

Viscounts Preston (1681)
Richard Graham, 1st Viscount Preston (1648–1695)
Edward Graham, 2nd Viscount Preston (1679–1710)
Charles Graham, 3rd Viscount Preston (1706–1739)

Graham baronets, of Esk (1629; Reverted)
Sir William Graham, 6th Baronet (1730–1774)
Sir Charles Graham, 7th Baronet (1764–1795)
Sir Robert Graham, 8th Baronet (1769–1852)
Sir Edward Graham, 9th Baronet (1820–1864)
Sir Robert James Stuart Graham, 10th Baronet (1845–1917)
Sir Montrose Stuart Graham, 11th Baronet (1875–1939)
Sir Montrose Stuart Graham, 12th Baronet (1904–1975)
Sir Ralph Wolfe Graham, 13th Baronet (1908–1988)
Sir Ralph Stuart Graham, 14th Baronet (born 1950)

The heir apparent is the present holder's only son, Gabriel Lawrence Graham (b. 1974).

Graham baronets, of Norton Conyers (1662)
Sir Richard Graham, 1st Baronet (1636–1711)
Sir Reginald Graham, 2nd Baronet (1670–1728)
Sir Bellingham Graham, 3rd Baronet (1702–1730)
Sir Reginald Graham, 4th Baronet (1704–1755)
Sir Bellingham Graham, 5th Baronet (1729–1790)
Sir Bellingham Graham, 6th Baronet (c. 1764–1796)
Sir Bellingham Reginald Graham, 7th Baronet (1789–1866)
Sir Reginald Henry Graham, 8th Baronet (1835–1920)
Sir (Reginald) Guy Graham, 9th Baronet (1878–1940)
Sir Richard Bellingham Graham, 10th Baronet (1912–1982)
Sir James Bellingham Graham, 11th Baronet (born 1940)

The heir presumptive was the present holder's brother Jeremy Richard Graham (born 1949).
The heir presumptive's heir apparent is his son Samuel Reginald Graham (born 1979).

Graham baronets, of Gartmore (1665)
Sir William Graham, 1st Baronet (died 1684)
Sir John Graham, 2nd Baronet (died 1708)

Graham baronets, of Netherby (1783)
Sir James Graham, 1st Baronet (1761–1824)
Sir James Robert George Graham, 2nd Baronet (1792–1861)
Sir Frederick Ulric Graham, 3rd Baronet (1820–1888)
Sir Richard James Graham, 4th Baronet (1859–1932)
Sir (Frederick) Fergus Graham, 5th Baronet (1893–1978)
Sir Charles Spencer Richard Graham, 6th Baronet (1919–1997)
Sir James Fergus Surtees Graham, 7th Baronet (born 1946)

The heir apparent is the present holder's only son Robert Charles Thomas Graham (born 1985).

Graham baronets, of Kirkstall (1808)

Sir James Graham, 1st Baronet (1783–1825)
Sir Sandford Graham, 2nd Baronet (1788–1852)
Sir Sandford Graham, 3rd Baronet (1821–1875)
Sir Lumley Graham, 4th Baronet (1828–1890)
Sir Cyril Clerke Graham, 5th Baronet (1834–1895)

Graham baronets, of Larbert House and Househill (1906)
Sir John Hatt Noble Graham, 1st Baronet (1837–1926)
Sir (John) Frederick Noble Graham, 2nd Baronet (1864–1936)
Sir John Reginald Noble Graham, 3rd Baronet (1892–1980)
Sir John Alexander Noble Graham, 4th Baronet (1926–2019)
Sir Andrew John Noble Graham, 5th Baronet (born 1956)

The heir apparent is the present holder's son James Patrick Noble Graham (born 1990)

Graham baronets, of Dromore (1964)
Sir Clarence Johnston Graham, 1st Baronet (1900–1966)
Sir John Moodie Graham, 2nd Baronet (1938–2020)

Notes

References 
Kidd, Charles, Williamson, David (editors). Debrett's Peerage and Baronetage (1990 edition). New York: St Martin's Press, 1990, 

Baronetcies in the Baronetage of England
Baronetcies in the Baronetage of Great Britain
Baronetcies in the Baronetage of the United Kingdom
Dormant baronetcies in the Baronetage of Nova Scotia
Extinct baronetcies in the Baronetage of Nova Scotia
Extinct baronetcies in the Baronetage of the United Kingdom
1629 establishments in England